K36NE-D, virtual channel 43 (UHF digital channel 36), is a low-powered, Class A 3ABN-affiliated television station licensed to Las Vegas, Nevada, United States. The station is owned by HC2 Holdings.

History
On February 22, 1995, the FCC granted a construction permit to Craig Allyn Jue to build a low-power television station on channel 15 to serve the Las Vegas metropolitan area. The station, given callsign K15EP, was not able to go on air, due to a new full-service station, KINC that came on the air in 1996. Jue sold the newly extended construction permit in October 1996 to Three Angels Broadcasting Network, who moved the station to channel 43. They licensed the station, identified as K43FO, on February 12, 1999, and converted the license to Class A on April 25, 2001. On March 16, 2012, the station changed its call sign to K43FO-D, reflecting its move to digital broadcasting. 3ABN sold K43FO-D and 13 other stations to HC2 Holdings for $9.6 million in 2017.

The station was licensed to move its signal to digital channel 36 on August 31, 2018, changing its call sign to K36NE-D.

Digital channels
The station's signal is multiplexed:

References

External links 
3ABN Official site

Religious television stations in the United States
Innovate Corp.
Television channels and stations established in 1999
Low-power television stations in the United States
36NE-D
1999 establishments in Nevada